Iain Robert Morrison (born 14 December 1962) is a retired rugby union player who made 15 appearances for the Scotland national rugby union team. He played flanker.

Early life
He was born in Linlithgow.

Rugby Union career

Amateur career

He played club rugby for London Scottish.

Provincial career

He played for the Anglo-Scots District in the Scottish Inter-District Championship.

International career

Morrison made his international debut on 16 January 1993 against Ireland at Murrayfield.

His last appearance was against New Zealand in the 1995 Rugby World Cup.

References

1962 births
Living people
London Scottish F.C. players
Rugby union flankers
Rugby union players from Linlithgow
Scotland international rugby union players
Scottish Exiles (rugby union) players
Scottish rugby union players